Federico Favaro Garcia (born 19 May 1991) is an Uruguay rugby union player who generally plays as a wing represents Uruguay internationally. He was included in the Uruguayan squad for the 2019 Rugby World Cup which was held in Japan for the first time and also marked his first World Cup appearance.

Career 
He made his international debut for Uruguay against Brazil on 1 May 2013.

References 

1991 births
Living people
Uruguayan rugby union players
Uruguay international rugby union players
Rugby sevens players at the 2011 Pan American Games
Pan American Games competitors for Uruguay
Rugby union wings
Rugby union players from Montevideo
Peñarol Rugby players
Rugby union centres